Escadrille Spa.90 (originally named Escadrille N.90) was a French fighter squadron that served in World War I from early 1917 until war's end. They were credited with destroying 13 German airplanes and 22 observation balloons.

History
Escadrille Spa.90 began by combining two existing formations, N504 and N507, in early 1917. It was founded as an integral fighter squadron to VIII Armee, and was initially dubbed Escadrille N.90 because Nieuport fighters were its predominant aircraft.

On 22 April 1918, the squadron was renamed Escadrille Spa.90 when it re-equipped with SPAD fighters. On 9 November 1918, the unit was Cited in orders for having destroyed 10 German airplanes and 14 observation balloons. However, its total victory score for the war was 13 airplanes and 22 balloons.

Commanding officers
 Lieutenant Pierre Weiss: Early 1917 - 4 November 1918

Notable members
 Lieutenant colonel Marius Ambrogi
 Lieutenant colonel Jean André Pezon
 Adjutant Charles J. V. Macé
 Adjutant Maurice Bizot

Aircraft
 Three Nieuport XXIVs: 3 March 1917
 Two Nieuport XXIV bis: 3 March 1917
 Seven Nieuport XXVII: 3 March 1917
 Three SPAD XIs: 3 March 1917
 SPADs: 22 April 1918

End notes

Reference
 Franks, Norman; Bailey, Frank (1993). Over the Front: The Complete Record of the Fighter Aces and Units of the United States and French Air Services, 1914–1918 London, UK: Grub Street Publishing. .

Squadrons of the French Service Aéronautique in World War I
Military units and formations established in 1917
Military units and formations disestablished in 1918